Mary Ann Magnin (1850–1943) was a Dutch-American businesswoman. She was the co-founder of I. Magnin, an upscale "specialty store" in San Francisco, California.

Early life
Mary Ann Cohen was born in 1850 in Scheveningen, The Hague, the Netherlands. Her father was a rabbi. She immigrated to England with her parents, settling in London, where she grew up.

Career
In the wake of the California Gold Rush, she decided to immigrate to the West coast of the United States with her husband and children. They arrived in San Francisco in 1875, traveling via Cape Horn. She established a clothing store in Oakland, where she sold baby clothes, lingerie, and bridal trousseaux. Two years later, in 1877, she moved the business to a larger store in San Francisco, and it became known as I. Magnin.

Even though she retired in 1900, she kept visiting her store daily until her death.

Personal life
She married Isaac Magnin on October 8, 1865, at the Great Synagogue of London. She was only fifteen years old. They had eight children: Samuel, Henrietta, Joseph, Emanuel John, Victor, Lucille, Flora, and Grover. They resided at the Saint Francis Hotel on Union Square. San Francisco artist May Slessinger painted miniature portraits of Mary Ann Magnin and her son Grover.

Death
She died on December 15, 1943, in San Francisco, California. She was ninety-four years old. She is buried at Hills of Eternity Memorial Park in Colma, California.

References

1850 births
1943 deaths
Dutch emigrants to the United States
Businesspeople from San Francisco
American fashion businesspeople
American people of Dutch-Jewish descent
Dutch Jews
Magnin family
Burials at Hills of Eternity Memorial Park